Korissia is a former municipality on the island of Corfu, Ionian Islands, Greece. Since the 2019 local government reform it is part of the municipality South Corfu, of which it is a municipal unit. It is in the southern part of the island. It has a land area of 27.675 km². Its population was 4,775 at the 2011 census. The seat of the municipality was the town of Argyrades (pop. 660). Its largest towns are Perivóli (pop. 1,378), Argyrádes, Petrití (663), and Ágios Geórgios (503).

Subdivisions
The municipal unit Korissia is subdivided into the following communities (constituent villages in brackets):
Argyrades (Argyrades, Agios Georgios, Marathias, Neochoraki)
Agios Nikolaos (Agios Nikolaos, Notos, Roumanades)
Kouspades (Kouspades, Boukari)
Perivoli (Perivoli, Potamia)
Petriti (Petriti, Korakades)
Vasilatika

Population

External links
Korissia on GTP Travel Pages

References

Populated places in Corfu (regional unit)